Lee Hsien Loong Cabinet may refer to Fifth Lee Hsien Loong Cabinet, the current Cabinet of Singapore that was sworn in on 27 July 2020 after the 2020 general election.

Lee Hsien Loong Cabinet may also refer to:
First Lee Hsien Loong Cabinet, the cabinet formed by Lee Hsien Loong after Goh Chok Tong having stepped down
Second Lee Hsien Loong Cabinet, the cabinet formed by Lee after the 2006 general election
Third Lee Hsien Loong Cabinet, the cabinet formed by Lee after the 2011 general election
Fourth Lee Hsien Loong Cabinet, the cabinet formed by Lee after the 2015 general election